University Hospital of Wales (UHW), also known as the Heath Hospital, is a 1,080-bed hospital in the Heath district of Cardiff, Wales. It is a teaching hospital of Cardiff University School of Medicine. Construction started in 1963, and the official opening took place in 1971. It was Europe's first fully integrated hospital and medical school, at a cost of £22 million. It is the third largest university hospital in the UK, and the largest hospital in Wales. The hospital was previously managed by Cardiff & Vale NHS Trust. In 2009 the Trust was dissolved and the hospital is now managed by Cardiff and Vale University Health Board.

History

Construction 
Planning for construction of the hospital began in 1951. The land was provided by Cardiff Council, which selected the site based on its accessibility from other parts of Wales as well as within Cardiff. The Welsh Board of Health and University Grants Committee outlined the criteria for an 820-bed hospital in 1953 and proposed a competition for architects to submit plans, although this was not sanctioned until 1958 due to concerns over funding.

The competition was launched in April 1959 and judged by Sir Percy Thomas (Past President of the Royal Institute of British Architects), J.H. Forshaw, F.R.S. Yorke, A. Trevor Jones (Provost of the Welsh National School of Medicine) and A.R. Culley (medical member of the Welsh Board of Health). Forty entries were submitted and the winning design was by Stanley Wayman Milburn, an architect with a special interest in schools and hospitals and who had previously designed 10 hospitals in the north east of England. 

The architecture of the hospital is dominated by long, parallel slabs, one eight-storied, the other five-storied. The Prince Charles Hospital in Merthyr Tydfil, Wales, completed in 1975, followed a similar design. 

Construction began in 1963 and the dental school opened to clinical students in 1965. Construction of the main hospital building began in 1966 and the topping out ceremony was conducted by G.R. Findlater on 4 July 1969, the eve of the 21st anniversary of the founding of the National Health Service. The hospital was officially opened by Queen Elizabeth II on 19 November 1971.

Operation 
In 1978, the main building was found to have deteriorated dangerously; £1 million was spent on repairs. The Welsh Office revealed in 1981 that a further £7.7 million was required for repairs.

In 2005, Base Structures completed a £1 million project by to construct a walkway joining separate parts of the hospital.

In August 2009, a £16 million birthing centre was opened at the hospital, with three birthing pools. The Midwife Led Unit handles around 90 births a month. In February 2010, a new delivery suite was completed at the Women's Unit, with 14 delivery rooms and two dedicated operating theatres.

In early 2019, the Cardiff and Vale University Health Board announced plans to build a new hospital by 2030, as part of a wider reorganisation of hospital services, including the University Hospital Llandough, Noah's Ark Children's Hospital, Cardiff Royal Infirmary, Barry Hospital and Whitchurch Hospital.

In September 2020, the University Hospital of Wales became the major trauma centre for the South Wales region.

On 8 February 2021, Lakeside Wing was completed. The modular building houses a multi-disciplinary model of care, with physiotherapists, occupational therapists, dieticians, pharmacists, healthcare support workers and registered nurses all working in the facility. The wing accommodates up to 400 beds.

Departments

Accident and Emergency unit
The Accident and Emergency unit is the third largest in the United Kingdom. In 2009, it treated an average of 750 people each weekend. The unit was scheduled to have a £3.4 million refit in 2013, but this was rescheduled due to increased demand on the service and the disruption the work would cause. In July 2020, the "call before you walk" system was adopted: less severely ill patients are directed to other services and those who need to be in A&E are given an appointment.  An analysis of 515 patients who attended on 18 November 2019 found that 109 patients could have been given advice on how to treat themselves or been seen elsewhere.

Transplant unit
A £4.27m transplant unit opened in August 2010, after three years of planning. It is on the top floor of a new building that also houses a renal outpatients’ department. It replaced a unit on ward B5 to increase availability of kidney transplants in Cardiff. UHW is Wales’ only kidney transplant centre and caters for patients from South, Mid and West Wales.

Hospital radio
The University Hospital of Wales is home to Radio Glamorgan, founded in 1967. In March 2014, the station won three national awards at the National Hospital Broadcasting Association awards held in Bristol.

Car parking
Parking facilities at the hospital were managed by Indigo Park Services UK Limited on a 15-year contract until June 2018. Indigo made a profit of £2.8 million in 2016 from this contract, from charges and fines.  80 staff challenged their fines in court. The hearing found that staff must pay £128 for each parking ticket, and the costs of the hearing, which amounted to £29,000. The company cancelled parking charge notices issued up to the end of March 2016, leaving more than 100,000 unpaid tickets outstanding. Parking is now managed by Parking Eye Ltd.

In popular culture
University Hospital of Wales was the subject of the television series Hospital 24/7, a documentary drama from BBC One about patients and staff. The first season was filmed in August 2008 and broadcast in January 2009. Two further seasons were broadcast in 2010 and 2011.

Controversies

Breaches of the Human Tissue Act
In August 2009, postmortem examinations were stopped at the hospital following an inspection which revealed serious breaches of the Human Tissue Act 2004, including the unauthorized storage of human brains.

H1N1 virus
In November 2009, the first person-to-person transmission of Tamiflu-resistant H1N1 in the world was confirmed at the hospital. Five patients were infected, with three apparently having been infected in the hospital itself in a case of iatrogenic transmission.

Sterility of surgical instruments
In June 2010, surgery was discontinued temporarily after surgeons complained the instruments they had been given had not been sterilized properly and were visibly dirty.

See also
Noah's Ark Appeal
Noah's Ark Children's Hospital for Wales

References

External links 

 
 Healthcare Inspectorate Wales inspection reports
 Radio Glamorgan website

Cardiff and Vale University Health Board
Hospital buildings completed in 1971
Hospitals in Cardiff
Cardiff University
NHS hospitals in Wales
Teaching hospitals in Wales
Hospitals established in 1971
1971 establishments in Wales